John Froelich (November 24, 1849 – May 24, 1933) was an American inventor who lived in Froelich, Iowa, a small village in northeast Iowa which was named for his father. In 1892, John Froelich developed the first stable gasoline/petrol-powered tractor with forward and reverse gears.

John Froelich attended school in red robbin, and at the College of Iowa. There he learned a lot about machinery. After college, he decided he would build the very first gasoline-powered tractor to go both forward and reverse.

Designed by his blacksmith Will Mann and himself, Froelich was able to build a 16-horsepower (12 kW) tractor that could go both forward and backward by the year 1892. After completing the tractor, Froelich and Mann brought it to Langford, South Dakota, where they would connect it to a J.I. Case threshing machine, and thresh 72,000 bushels in 52 days.

Around 1895, he left Froelich, Iowa, and settled in Marshalltown, Iowa, then moved to St. Paul, Minnesota. He later developed a new type of clothes-washing machine he named the Froelich Neostyle Washer.

There is a museum in the small town of Froelich, Iowa where John Froelich assembled his first gasoline tractor.

References

1849 births
1933 deaths
19th-century American inventors
20th-century American inventors
People from Waterloo, Iowa
People from Galena, Illinois
People from Marshalltown, Iowa
People from Saint Paul, Minnesota
People from Clayton County, Iowa